In mathematics and computer science, computer algebra, also called symbolic computation or algebraic computation, is a scientific area that refers to the study and development of algorithms and software for manipulating mathematical expressions and other mathematical objects. Although computer algebra could be considered a subfield of scientific computing, they are generally considered as distinct fields because scientific computing is usually based on numerical computation with approximate floating point numbers, while symbolic computation emphasizes exact computation with expressions containing variables that have no given value and are manipulated as symbols.

Software applications that perform symbolic calculations are called computer algebra systems, with the term system alluding to the complexity of the main applications  that include, at least, a method to represent mathematical data in a computer, a user programming language (usually different from the language used for the implementation), a dedicated memory manager, a user interface for the input/output of mathematical expressions, a large set of routines to perform usual operations, like simplification of expressions, differentiation using chain rule, polynomial factorization, indefinite integration, etc.

Computer algebra is widely used to experiment in mathematics and to design the formulas that are used in numerical programs. It is also used for complete scientific computations, when purely numerical methods fail, as in public key cryptography, or for some non-linear problems.

Terminology 

Some authors distinguish computer algebra from symbolic computation using the latter name to refer to kinds of symbolic computation other than the computation with mathematical formulas. Some authors use symbolic computation for the computer science aspect of the subject and "computer algebra" for the mathematical aspect. In some languages the name of the field is not a direct translation of its English name. Typically, it is called calcul formel in French, which means "formal computation". This name reflects the ties this field has with formal methods.

Symbolic computation has also been referred to, in the past, as symbolic manipulation, algebraic manipulation, symbolic processing, symbolic mathematics, or symbolic algebra, but these terms, which also refer to non-computational manipulation, are no longer used in reference to computer algebra.

Scientific community 
There is no learned society that is specific to computer algebra, but this function is assumed by the special interest group of the Association for Computing Machinery named SIGSAM (Special Interest Group
on Symbolic and Algebraic Manipulation).

There are several annual conferences on computer algebra, the premier being ISSAC (International Symposium on Symbolic and Algebraic Computation), which is regularly sponsored by SIGSAM.

There are several journals specializing in computer algebra, the top one being Journal of Symbolic Computation founded in 1985 by Bruno Buchberger. There are also several other journals that regularly publish articles in computer algebra.

Computer science aspects

Data representation 

As numerical software is highly efficient for approximate numerical computation, it is common, in computer algebra, to emphasize exact computation with exactly represented data. Such an exact representation implies that, even when the size of the output is small, the intermediate data generated during a computation may grow in an unpredictable way. This behavior is called expression swell. To obviate this problem, various methods are used in the representation of the data, as well as in the algorithms that manipulate them.

Numbers 
The usual numbers systems used in numerical computation are floating point numbers and integers of a fixed bounded size. None of these is convenient for computer algebra, due to expression swell.

Therefore, the basic numbers used in computer algebra are the integers of the mathematicians, commonly represented by an unbounded signed sequence of digits in some base of numeration, usually the largest base allowed by the machine word. These integers allow to define the rational numbers, which are irreducible fractions of two integers.

Programming an efficient implementation of the arithmetic operations is a hard task. Therefore, most free computer algebra systems and some commercial ones such as Mathematica and Maple (software), use the GMP library, which is thus a de facto standard.

Expressions 

Except for numbers and variables, every mathematical expression may be viewed as the symbol of an operator followed by a sequence of operands. In computer algebra software, the expressions are usually represented in this way. This representation is very flexible, and many things that seem not to be mathematical expressions at first glance, may be represented and manipulated as such. For example, an equation is an expression with "=" as an operator, a matrix may be represented as an expression with "matrix" as an operator and its rows as operands.

Even programs may be considered and represented as expressions with operator "procedure" and, at least, two operands, the list of parameters and the body, which is itself an expression with "body" as an operator and a sequence of instructions as operands. Conversely, any mathematical expression may be viewed as a program.

This process of delayed evaluation is fundamental in computer algebra. For example, the operator "=" of the equations is also, in most computer algebra systems, the name of the program of the equality test: normally, the evaluation of an equation results in an equation, but, when an equality test is needed, either explicitly asked by the user through an "evaluation to a Boolean" command, or automatically started by the system in the case of a test inside a program, then the evaluation to a boolean result is executed.

As the size of the operands of an expression is unpredictable and may change during a working session, the sequence of the operands is usually represented as a sequence of either pointers (like in Macsyma) or entries in a hash table (like in Maple).

Simplification 

 
A simpler expression than this is generally desired, and simplification is needed when working with general expressions.

This simplification is normally done through rewriting rules. There are several classes of rewriting rules to be considered. They are systematically applied in computer algebra systems.

A difficulty occurs with associative operations like addition and multiplication. In other words, in the internal representation of the expressions, there is no subtraction nor division nor unary minus, outside the representation of the numbers.

Another difficulty occurs with the commutativity of addition and multiplication. The problem is to quickly recognize the like terms in order to combine or cancel them. Testing every pair of terms is costly with very long sums and products. To address this, Macsyma sorts the operands of sums and products into an order that places like terms in consecutive places, allowing easy detection. In Maple, a hash function is designed for generating collisions when like terms are entered, allowing the to be combined as soon as they are introduced. This allows subexpressions that appear several times in a computation to be immediately recognized and stored only once. This saves memory and speeds up computation by avoiding repetition of the same operations on identical expressions.

Some rewriting rules sometimes increase and sometimes decrease the size of the expressions to which they are applied. This is the case of distributivity or trigonometric identities. For example, the distributivity law allows rewriting  and  As there is no way to make a good general choice of applying or not such a rewriting rule, such rewriting is done only when explicitly invoked by the user. For the distributivity, the computer function that applies this rewriting rule is typically called "expand". The reverse rewriting rule, called "factor", requires a non-trivial algorithm, which is thus a key function in computer algebra systems (see Polynomial factorization).

Mathematical aspects 

Some fundamental mathematical questions arise when one wants to manipulate mathematical expressions in a computer. We consider mainly the case of the multivariate rational fractions. This is not a real restriction, because, as soon as the irrational functions appearing in an expression are simplified, they are usually considered as new indeterminates. For example, 
 

Equality 
There are two notions of equality for mathematical expressions. Syntactic equality is the equality of their representation in a computer. This is easy to test in a program. Semantic equality is when two expressions represent the same mathematical object, as in

It is known from Richardson's theorem that there may not exist an algorithm that decides whether two expressions representing numbers are semantically equal if exponentials and logarithms are allowed in the expressions. Accordingly, (semantic) equality may be tested only on some classes of expressions such as the polynomials and rational fractions.

To test the equality of two expressions, instead of designing specific algorithms, it is usual to put expressions in some canonical form or to put their difference in a normal form, and to test the syntactic equality of the result.

In computer algebra, "canonical form" and "normal form" are not synonymous. A canonical form is such that two expressions in canonical form are semantically equal if and only if they are syntactically equal, while a normal form is such that an expression in normal form is semantically zero only if it is syntactically zero. In other words, zero has a unique representation as an expression in normal form.

Normal forms are usually preferred in computer algebra for several reasons. Firstly, canonical forms may be more costly to compute than normal forms. For example, to put a polynomial in canonical form, one has to expand every product through distributivity, while it is not necessary with a normal form (see below). Secondly, it may be the case, like for expressions involving radicals, that a canonical form, if it exists, depends on some arbitrary choices and that these choices may be different for two expressions that have been computed independently. This may make impracticable the use of a canonical form.

History
At the beginning of computer algebra, circa 1970, when the long-known algorithms were first put on computers, they turned out to be highly inefficient. Therefore, a large part of the work of the researchers in the field consisted in revisiting classical algebra in order to make it effective and to discover efficient algorithms to implement this effectiveness. A typical example of this kind of work is the computation of polynomial greatest common divisors, which is required to simplify fractions. Surprisingly, the classical Euclid's algorithm turned out to be inefficient for polynomials over infinite fields, and thus new algorithms needed to be developed. The same was also true for the classical algorithms from linear algebra.

See also 
 Automated theorem prover
 Computer-assisted proof
 Computational algebraic geometry
 Computer algebra system
 Proof checker
 Model checker
 Symbolic-numeric computation
 Symbolic simulation
 Symbolic artificial intelligence

References

Further reading 
For a detailed definition of the subject: 
Symbolic Computation (An Editorial), Bruno Buchberger, Journal of Symbolic Computation (1985) 1, pp. 1–6.
For textbooks devoted to the subject: